AYF may refer to:
American Youth Football
American Youth Foundation
Armenian Youth Federation